Ovelgünne is a village in the municipality of Eilsleben, Saxony-Anhalt, Germany. Before September 2010 it was an independent municipality.

Former municipalities in Saxony-Anhalt
Börde (district)